The 1971 Australian Drivers’ Championship was a CAMS sanctioned motor racing title open to Australian Formula 1 and Australian Formula 2 racing cars. It was the fifteenth Australian Drivers' Championship and the first to feature cars complying with a new for 1971 Australian Formula 1 which permitted cars with production based V8 engines of up to 5 litre capacity (commonly known as Formula 5000 cars) or racing engines of up to eight cylinders and up to 2 litre capacity. The championship winner was awarded the 1971 CAMS Gold Star and the title of Australian Champion Driver.

The championship was won by Max Stewart from Kevin Bartlett, Alan Hamilton and John McCormack, with only two points separating first from fourth after the final race.

Calendar

The championship was contested over a six race series. Races were staged concurrently with those of the 1971 Australian Formula 2 Championship

Points system
Championship points were awarded on a 9-6-4-3-2-1 basis to the first six placegetters in each race. Each driver could retain points only from his/her best five race results. Only holders of a General Competition License issued by CAMS were eligible to compete for the title.

Championship standings

New Zealander Graeme Lawrence (Brabham BT30 Ford) placed second at Oran Park, but not being an Australian resident he did not qualify for championship points.

References

External links
 Australian Gold Star 1971, www.oldracingcars.com
 1971 Oran Park Gold Star…, primotipo.com
 Images from the Oran Park race at forums.autosport.com

Australian Drivers' Championship
Drivers' Championship